Pterostylis scoliosa, commonly known as the small kinked greenhood, is a species of orchid endemic to Queensland. As with similar greenhoods, the flowering plants differ from those which are not flowering. The non-flowering plants have a rosette of leaves flat on the ground but the flowering plants have a single flower with leaves on the flowering stem. This greenhood has a white, pale green and pale brown flower with a kinked or curved labellum protruding above the sinus between the lateral sepals.

Description
Pterostylis scoliosa is a terrestrial, perennial, deciduous, herb with an underground tuber and when not flowering, a rosette of shiny green leaves lying flat on the ground. The flower is white, pale green and pale brown. The sinus between the lateral sepals bulges slightly and is V-shaped. Flowering occurs from March to May.

Taxonomy and naming
Pterostylis scoliosa was first formally described in 1997 by David Jones from a specimen collected in the Brisbane Forest Park by Cecil Ralph Crane. The description was published in Proceedings of the Linnean Society of New South Wales. The specific epithet (scoliosa) is derived from the Ancient Greek word skolios meaning "curved", "bent" or "oblique".

Distribution and habitat
The small kinked greenhood grows on steep, rocky slopes in open forest, often near streams. It is only known from the Brisbane Forest Park.

Conservation
Pterostylis scoliosa is classified as "endangered" under the Queensland Government Nature Conservation Act 1992.

References

scoliosa
Endemic orchids of Australia
Orchids of Queensland
Plants described in 1997